Dell Li Hon Ho ( born on 14 July 1986 in Hong Kong) is a Hong Kong professional football who currently plays as a goalkeeper for Hong Kong Premier League club Tai Po.

Club career
On 30 May 2010, Li joined Pegasus as Yapp Hung Fai's replacement.

In June 2011, Li returned to Tai Po. Following Tai Po's relegation to the Second Division, Li joined newly promoted First Division side Eastern on 2 June 2013.

On 19 July 2019, Li moved to Lee Man. On 2 June 2020, Li was named on a list of departures from the club.

On 16 August 2020, Li revealed that he had retired from football upon the end of his contract with Lee Man. He is now an insurance broker.

International career
Since Li's performance was well in the club, head coaches of Hong Kong, Dejan Antonić and Goran Paulić, decided to pick him up into the main team squad. He played against Macau on 19 November 2008 in his one and only appearance for Hong Kong.

Career statistics

International career
As of 19 November 2008

Honours

Club
Sun Hei
 Hong Kong Senior Shield: 2004–05
 Hong Kong FA Cup: 2004–05, 2005–06
 Hong Kong League Cup: 2004–05

Tai Po
 Hong Kong Premier League: 2018–19
 Hong Kong First Division: 2015–16
 Hong Kong Senior Shield: 2012–13
 Hong Kong FA Cup: 2008–09
 Hong Kong Sapling Cup: 2016–17

Eastern
 Hong Kong Senior Shield: 2014–15
 Hong Kong FA Cup: 2013–14

International
 East Asian Games: 2009

Individual
 Best Young Player: 2009

References

External links
 
 

1986 births
Living people
Hong Kong footballers
Hong Kong First Division League players
Hong Kong Premier League players
Association football goalkeepers
Tai Po FC players
TSW Pegasus FC players
Eastern Sports Club footballers
Lee Man FC players
Hong Kong international footballers